The NedWeb project is a cultural documentation centre, with an online database, an initiative of the Department of Dutch Language Studies ("Netherlandistics") at the University of Vienna.

It contains documentation on Dutch literature, Dutch language and Dutch culture. Its aim is to promote literature and a broader public understanding of Dutch and Flemish culture.

External links 
 Information on Netherlandistics: Netherlandistics website, University of Vienna (in Dutch, German and English with parts in Hungarian, Polish, Slovenian, Slovak and Czech)
 Comenius Association website, University of Vienna

Dutch language
Flanders
Foreign relations of the Netherlands
University of Vienna